A fish aggregating (or aggregation) device (FAD) is a man-made object used to attract ocean-going pelagic fish such as marlin, tuna and mahi-mahi (dolphin fish). They usually consist of buoys or floats tethered to the ocean floor with concrete blocks. FADs attract fish for numerous reasons that vary by species. 

Fish tend to move around FADs in varying orbits, rather than remaining stationary below the buoys. Both recreational and commercial fisheries use FADs.

Before FADs, commercial tuna fishing used purse seining to target surface-visible aggregations of birds and dolphins, which were a reliable signal of the presence of tuna schools below. The demand for dolphin-safe tuna was a driving force for FADs.

In the past, people in the Pacific islands used bamboo rafts to make it easier to catch tuna that gathered below. Today, the FAD has made fishing much easier for them.

Fish behaviour

Fish are fascinated with floating objects. They use them to mark locations for mating activities. They aggregate in considerable numbers around objects such as drifting flotsam, rafts, jellyfish and floating seaweed. The objects appear to provide a "visual stimulus in an optical void", and offer refuge for juvenile fish from predators. The gathering of juvenile fish, in turn, attracts larger predator fish. A study using sonar in French Polynesia, found large shoals of juvenile bigeye tuna and yellowfin tuna aggregated closest to the devices, 10 to 50m. Further out, 50 to 150m, was a less dense group of larger yellowfin and albacore tuna. Yet further out, to 500m, was a dispersed group of various large adult tuna. The distribution and density of these groups was variable and overlapped. The FADs were also used by other fish, and the aggregations dispersed when it was dark.

Types
Drifting FADs are not tethered to the bottom and can be man made, or natural objects such as logs or driftwood.

Moored FADs occupy a fixed location and attach to the sea bottom using a weight such as a concrete block. A rope made of floating synthetics such as polypropylene attaches to the mooring and in turn attaches to a buoy. The buoy can float at the surface (lasting 3–4 years) or lie subsurface to avoid detection and surface hazards such as weather and ship traffic. Subsurface FADs last longer (5–6 years) due to less wear and tear, but can be harder to locate. In some cases the upper section of rope is made from heavier-than-water metal chain so that if the buoy detaches from the rope, the rope sinks and thereby avoids damage to passing ships who no longer use the buoy to avoid getting tangled in the rope.

Smart FADs include sonar and GPS capabilities so that the operator can remotely contact it via satellite to determine the population under the FAD.

Scope
Drifting FADs are widespread in the Atlantic, Pacific and Indian ocean purse seine fisheries. They catch over 1 million tons of tuna (nearly one-third of the global tuna total) and over 100,000 tons of by-catch in the vicinity of FADs as of 2005. Skipjack Katsuwonus pelamis, bigeye tuna Thunnus obesus and yellowfin Thunnus albacares tuna are the three primary tropical tuna species that FADs target. Other fish include albacore, dolphin fish, wahoo, blue marlin, striped marlin, mako shark, silky shark, whitetip shark, galapagos shark, mackerel, and  
bonito.

Before FADs, pelagic purse seiners targeted free-swimming schools of tuna. Increasing FAD use over the past 30 years has increased the productivity of the fishing fleet, but has significant side-effects. The average FAD-caught fish is smaller and comes with relatively large bycatch raising concern about declining populations of several species of pelagic sharks.

The U.S. state of Hawaii operates 55 surface FADs around its islands to support sport fishing and marine research.

See also 
 Artificial reef
 Biorock
 Marine debris
 Multi-purpose reef

References

External links
 FADs in Hawaii, USA
 FADs in New South Wales, Australia
 FADs in the Commonwealth of the Northern Mariana Islands, USA
 Bhavani, V (2004) Fish Aggregating Devices Information Sources FAO: Information document: BOBP/INF/2, Rome.

Fishing equipment